Rainy Butte is a summit in Slope County, North Dakota, in the United States.

Rainy Butte was so named on account of fog frequently occurring at its peak.

References

Landforms of Slope County, North Dakota
Mountains of North Dakota